Aslam Shaikh is an Indian politician from the Indian National Congress. He is serving as Member of the Maharashtra Legislative Assembly representing the Malad West Assembly Constituency in Mumbai, Maharashtra. He was serving as the Textile, Fisheries Department & Ports Development Minister in the former Maha Vikas Aghadi cabinet.

Controversy 
On 28 July 2015 Aslam Shaikh wrote a letter to then president of India Pranab Mukherjee seeking a mercy for 1993 bomb blast convict Yakub Memon.

References

Living people
Maharashtra MLAs 2014–2019
Indian Muslims
Indian National Congress politicians
1972 births